Gordon Fredric Hamilton (born 13 May 1964 in Belfast) is a retired Irish rugby union player. He played as an open-side wing-forward.

Hamilton played for N.I.F.C., Howe Of Fife (Scotland), Ballymena and Ulster.

He had 10 caps for Ireland, from 1991 to 1992, scoring a single try. The most famous moment came of his career came at the 1991 Rugby World Cup, when he scored a try in the last couple of minutes of Ireland's quarter-final against Australia to put Ireland ahead. However, Michael Lynagh scored at the other end to put Ireland out of the tournament.

Hamilton owned and ran a shipping and stevedoring business in Ireland before selling the group to J&J Denholm Group of Scotland in 2012.

Hamilton served as Chairman of the Professional Game Boards at Ulster Rugby and the Irish Rugby Football Union. Current Chairman of James Tolland & Company Limited, a grain and animal feed trading business, he continues to work on a voluntary basis for Campbell College Belfast.

References

External links
Gordon Hamilton International Statistics

1964 births
Living people
North of Ireland F.C. players
Ulster Rugby players
Irish rugby union players
Ireland international rugby union players
Howe of Fife RFC players